8,000 Process (from the ) is the unofficial name of the legal investigation for the events surrounding accusations about the Colombian Liberal Party candidate Ernesto Samper's 1994 campaign for President of Colombia being partially funded with drug money. 8,000 Process was the case number issued by the Prosecutor General's Office.

The Process formally ended in the mid-1990s.

Timeline

June 1994
June 15: Defeated Conservative candidate Andrés Pastrana claims to have received tape recordings from an unnamed man while he was visiting the city of Cali. These tapes, the so-called "narco-cassettes", contained hours of discussions between members of the Colombian Liberal Party and a man speaking on behalf of the Cali cartel. Many of the conversations were about the contribution of huge amounts of money for the political campaign "Samper for President", and details of amounts and purposes, also discussed.
June 16: Pastrana meets the President of Colombia, César Gaviria, to give him a copy of these recordings.
June 17: President Gaviria hands the tapes to the Attorney General, Gustavo de Greiff. On that same day, Pastrana made public a letter to Samper in which he challenged the latter to renounce his recent electoral victory if evidence is found of drug money supporting his campaign.
June 21: Samper rejects such proposition, denies allegations of drug money entering his campaign, and requests a formal investigation of the charges.
June 22: Pastrana releases a statement clarifying how he obtained the narco-cassettes and again demands that Samper promises to resign his position if there is proof of drug money entering his presidential campaign.
June 24: The Prosecutor General's Office calls some of the people mentioned in the narco-cassettes, who allegedly benefited from this drug money; among these people are former presidential candidate Miguel Maza Márquez (also former General and Director of Colombia's Intelligence Service, DAS), Hernán Beltz Peralta, Álvaro Pava, César Villegas, Santiago Medina (former treasurer of the "Samper for President" campaign), Alberto Giraldo, Carlos Oviedo and Eduardo Mestre.

July 1994
July 9: Several international news agencies claim the existence of yet another "narco-cassette".
July 11: The United States Drug Enforcement Administration (DEA) cancels a scheduled visit to Washington DC by Octavio Vargas and Rosso José Serrano, director and sub-director of Colombia's National Police.
July 13: The Procuraduria General de la Nacion (Attorney General's Office) states that the narco-cassettes had been edited and manipulated to highlight specific conversations. The Attorney General also reveals that a letter signed by the Rodríguez Orejuela brothers (leaders of the Cali Cartel), stated that neither Samper's nor Pastrana's campaign had received any money from them.
July 14: Guillermo Pallomari (a prominent member of the Cali Cartel) is arrested in the city of Cali and admits to having been an accountant for the Rodriguez Orejuela brothers.
July 15: The US Senate approves a law by which any future aid to Colombia in the fight against drugs is conditioned by a certificate granted yearly by the US President.
July 26: Alfonso Valdivieso Sarmiento is named Colombia's new Attorney General to succeed de Greiff.

August 1994
August 7: Ernesto Samper takes office as president.
August 13: Local news media reveal that the Cali Search Bloc (a specialized task force of Colombian police dedicated to investigating the Cali Cartel) found a list of people allegedly paid by drug traffickers. This list named local police officers and a former senator, Eduardo Mestre.
August 16: Attorney General de Greiff orders that the case based on the narco-cassettes be suspended due to lack of evidence.
August 18: Alfonso Valdivieso is appointed Colombia's new Attorney General.
August 19: The Procuraduria General de la Nacion (Attorney General's Office) supports de Greiff's decision.

September 1994
September 30: Joe Toft, former DEA director for Colombia, in an interview for local media defines Colombia as a narcodemocracy, and states that Samper's campaign was partially financed by drug money from the Cali Cartel.

December 1994
December 7: President Samper and the Secretary of Defense, Fernando Botero (former campaign manager of Samper's presidential campaign), publicly reprimand General Camilo Hernando Zúñiga (top general of the Colombian Armed Forces). The reason for this claimed that the Cali Search Bloc had interrupted a party for Miguel Rodríguez Orejuela's daughter who was celebrating her first communion.
December 8: Attorney General Valdivieso denies Samper's and Botero's claims.
December 19: Valdivieso states that he is looking into reopening the case of the narco-cassettes.

January 1995
January 27: Myles Frechette, United States Ambassador to Colombia, suggests the possibility that President Clinton will not certify Colombia's effort on the War on Drugs.
January 30: A report in the local Revista Cambio 16 magazine says that the Cali Cartel had given "Samper for President" T-shirts to several political leaders.

February 1995
February 14: US Secretary of State Warren Christopher states that the attitude of the Colombian government in the fight against drugs is not "completely satisfactory".

March 1995
March 1: The United States issues Colombia a conditional certification.
March 2: The Dallas Morning News publishes an article with the testimony of a woman named María. She is an alleged witness of conversations between the Cali Cartel and Samper during the 1989 presidential campaign.
March 17: Jorge Eliécer Rodríguez Orejuela, the youngest of the Rodríguez Orejuela brothers, is captured in the city of Cali.
March 28: The newspaper La Prensa publishes a list of some 200 army and police officers that allegedly received money from the Cali Cartel.

April 1995
April 4: Misael Pastrana, former president of Colombia and father of the defeated Conservative candidate, publicly asks that the elected president "swear that he did not receive any money from the drug cartels and that he never knew that his campaign received any such money". 
President Samper, in a press conference, asks that he should be accused based on facts and not based on lies and rumors. He states that his life is "an open book".
April 21: Former senator Eduardo Mestre is arrested in connection with an investigation of illicit money. 
Prosecutor General Valdivieso requests that the Colombian Supreme Court open an investigation against nine congressmen — Álvaro Benedetti, Jaime Lara, José Guerra de la Espriella, Alberto Santofimio, Armando Holguín, Ana de Petchal, Rodrigo Garavito, Yolima Espinosa and María Izquierdo — for alleged bank transactions from members of the Cali Cartel during the 1994 congressional elections. 
Valdivieso requests that the Supreme Court investigate David Turbay, the Comptroller General, and orders a reopening of the case against former "Samper for President" campaign treasurer Santiago Medina.
April 22: The Colombian Liberal Party suspends the nine present and former members of congress accused by Valdivieso.
April 25: The Attorney General's Office sends a document filed under the number "8,000" to the Supreme Court of Justice. This document is in reference to the nine congressional members and two others accused of receiving money from the Cali Cartel.

May 1995
May 10: Luis Fernando Murcillo surrenders to the police in Bogotá.
May 25: Journalist Alberto Giraldo (aka "El Loco") surrenders to police authorities.

June 1995
June 4: The nation's Procurador General, Orlando Vásquez, is called by the Supreme Court to answer questions about allegations of illicit increases in his wealth.
June 9: Gilberto Rodríguez, the Cali Cartel's number one boss is captured. Prosecutor General issues an arrest warrant for the journalist Alberto Giraldo.
June 13: A priest and former mayor of the city of Barranquilla, Bernardo Hoyos says he spoke with members of the Cali Cartel. He claims that he listened to recordings and read documents that implicate several politicians with money received from the Cali Cartel. Hoyos also claims that Miguel Rodríguez wanted to surrender under "appropriate conditions".
June 20: Henry Loaiza, a.k.a. "El Alacrán", surrenders to police in Bogotá. 
The Attorney General's Office extends the investigation under the "8,000" process to five more congresspeople; Francisco José Jattin, Jorge Ramón Elías Nader, Tiberio Villareal, Álvaro Pava and Gustavo Espinosa.
June 24: Víctor Patiño, number six in the Cali Cartel organization, surrenders in Bogotá.
June 27: Fr. Hoyos testifies before the Attorney General's Office about the documents and checks that were allegedly shown to him by Miguel Rodríguez.

July 1995

July 4: José Santacruz, number three in the Cali Cartel, is captured in Bogotá.
July 7: Phanor Arizabaleta, fifth man on the Cali Cartel, surrenders to authorities.
July 17: Santiago Medina testifies to the Attorney General's Office that a check for 40 million pesos (US$32,000 at the time) issued by the Cali Cartel was sent to the Samper campaign's manager in the Valle del Cauca Department, Jorge Herrera.
July 20: The former consul of Colombia in Miami, Andrés Talero, testifies before the Prosecutor General's Office about secret documents in Santiago Medina's possession, which could prove links between the "Samper for President" presidential campaign and the Cali Cartel.
July 21: Jorge Herrera denies Medina's story and states that he was never asked to investigate the origin of the 40 million pesos check.
July 24: Several journalists reveal an alleged payoff list of Miguel Rodríguez. In the list there were the names of several congressmen, political figures and athletes. This list was in a briefcase abandoned when Rodríguez was almost captured during a raid by the Cali Search Bloc.
July 26: Santiago Medina is imprisoned for having received drug money. He is also charged with lying under oath.
July 27: In a televised address to the nation, President Samper states that if drug money made its way into his campaign's finances, it happened "behind his back". He requested that the Accusation Commission of the Colombian Chamber of Representatives investigate him.
July 28: Secretary of Interior Horacio Serpa censors the Under-prosecutor General Adolfo Salamanca, and accused him of giving reserved information to journalists, particularly information related to the so-called "8,000 process".
July 31: In a press conference, the Secretary of Defense Fernando Botero and the Secretary of Interior Horacio Serpa say that they know parts of Santiago Medina's statements given to the Prosecutor. When asked how they obtained what was supposed to be a reserved document, Botero stated that "the government knows of this information...", only to hesitantly look to Serpa for an answer. Serpa was caught off guard, but rapidly answered, "The government knows of this reserved document ... through an anonymous source!", and quickly added, "because we live in the country of anonymous sources!". According to both men, Medina's statements "turn on a fan with the sole intent of tarnishing the President". Both gave assurances that they would accept responsibility for any wrongdoing during the presidential campaign.

August 1995
August 1: The Prosecutor General's Office is asked to initiate appropriate inquiries against Botero and Benedetti.
August 2: Fernando Botero resigns as Secretary of Defense. He states that he did so in order to face accusations made by Santiago Medina. Medina's complete testimony is published. The Prosecutor General's Office initiates an investigations for the apparent release of reserved documents by Fernando Botero.
August 3: Andrés Talero announces that his apartment was ransacked. Additionally, warehouses and apartments of key witnesses in the "8,000 process" have been ransacked.
August 4: The Commission of the House of Representatives officially receives copies of the evidence against President Samper in the "8,000 process".
August 6: Miguel Rodríguez Orejuela is captured in Cali.
August 8: The weekly magazine "Semana" reveals a new tape in which President Samper is recorded speaking to Elizabeth Montoya de Sarria, the wife of a convicted drug dealer. In this tape, Samper refers to her as "Monita Retrechera" in what appears to be very friendly terms. In the same issue, Semana reveals that former Secretary of Defense Botero ordered the transfer of Víctor Patiño from a prison near Cali to a prison in Bogotá in an irregular manner.
August 9: President Samper asks attorney Antonio José Cancino to represent him before the Commission of the House of Representatives.
August 10: Cancino states before the commission that he possesses irrefutable evidence to vindicate Samper. Former Conservative candidate Andrés Pastrana states in the news program CM& that different stories about alleged checks from drug lords to his campaign are unfounded and requests 15 minutes of airtime on national TV to present his case.
August 15: Former Defense Secretary Botero is arrested and he is added to the "8,000 process". During a heated debate of the "8,000 process" in the House of Representatives, Secretary of Interior Serpa makes a strong defense of the President and ferverously states, "Is the President going to quit? Mamola!!" (Colombian slang for "No Way").
August 17: In a televised address, Andrés Pastrana suggests that the President should take a leave of absence until the investigations are completed.
August 22: Publicist Mauricio Montejo testifies that journalist Alberto Giraldo delivered to him 300 million pesos (approximately US$240,000 at the time) on behalf of the "Samper for President" campaign, as payment for publicity.
August 24: Jacquin Strouss, Colombia's First lady, testifies before the Prosecutor General's Office.
August 28: Secretary of Interior Serpa appears before the Prosecutor General's Office to give his version of how the reserved statements made by former campaign treasurer Santiago Medina ended in the government's possession (see the July 31, 1995 entry).
August 31: The Ethics Committee of the Liberal Party decides to temporarily suspend former Secretary Botero and former campaign treasurer Medina.

September 1995

September 4: Several news media reveal that Elizabeth Montoya de Sarria (see entry: August 8, 1995) donated 32 million pesos (US$26,000) in cash to the "Samper for President" campaign.
September 5: The President's defense attorney states that during the presidential campaign, certain individuals illegally benefited themselves by appropriating some of the donated money.
September 6: Santiago Medina gives further details to the Prosecutor General's Office.
September 19: The public is informed that former accountant to the Cali Cartel, Guillermo Pallomari, has struck a deal with the DEA and is surrendering to them.
September 22: In a letter to Santiago Medina, Miguel Rodríguez states that the check for 40 million pesos was in regards to the purchase of some artworks and this money had nothing to do with the campaign.
September 26: President Samper testifies for nine hours before the President of the Accusation Committee of the House of Representatives, Heine Mogollón. As he leaves, Samper states, "I found myself in a complex and artificial mesh filled with lies". Heine Mogollón admits that he received a loan from Finagro for 19 million pesos to finance his own campaign for representative. The Supreme Court investigates Rodrigo Garavito for allegedly receiving illicit money.
September 27: The President's attorney, Antonio José Cancino, is shot by unknown assailants in Bogotá. Cancino survives and is treated in the Central Military Hospital. The head director of the DAS (Colombia's Intelligence Service), Ramiro Bejarano, claims that national and foreign organisations are behind this attack. Secretary of Interior Serpa suggests that the idea of the DEA being involved in this attack is not far-fetched.
September 28: Chancellor Rodrigo Pardo, while on an official visit to the US, quickly repudiates Serpa's comments. The US government emphatically rejects these accusations and holds the Colombian government responsible for the security of its nationals in Colombia. Under Prosecutor General, Adolfo Salamanca, states during an interview to CM& news that the Liberal Party received drug money for its campaign. He adds that it is now time for his office to determine those responsible and directly involved.

See also
Corruption in Colombia

References

External links
 https://archive.today/20130106112657/http://lasa-2.univ.pitt.edu/LARR/prot/search/retrieve/?Vol=36&Num=2&Start=157
 http://www.bdigital.unal.edu.co/798/13/274_-_12_Capi_11.pdf

Further reading
 

Political scandals in Colombia
20th-century scandals
1994 in Colombia
1995 in Colombia